Pratylenchus flakkensis is a plant pathogenic nematode.

References

External links 
 Nemaplex, University of California - Pratylenchus flakkensis

flakkensis
Plant pathogenic nematodes